AAMC may refer to:

 Al Ain Men's College, one of 12 colleges that constitute the Higher Colleges of Technology, Emirate of Abu Dhabi
 American Alliance for Medical Cannabis, a pro-medical cannabis organization, USA
 Anne Arundel Medical Center, regional health system, USA
 Association of American Medical Colleges, a non-profit organization established in 1876, USA
 Association of Art Museum Curators
 Australian Army Medical Corps, established 1903, and granted "Royal" prefix in 1948